Tanggu railway station is a railway station located in Binhai District, Tianjin, China. It is on the Tianjin–Shanhaiguan railway and Beijing–Tianjin intercity railway.

Railway stations in Tianjin
Major National Historical and Cultural Sites in Tianjin